Punta di Capel Rosso lighthouse  or Punta Rossa is an active lighthouse on Isola del Giglio on the Tyrrhenian Sea.

Description

See also
 List of lighthouses in Italy

References

External links
 Servizio Fari Marina Militare 

Lighthouses in Italy
Lighthouses in Tuscany